The  is a wheeled self-propelled artillery vehicle under development by the Japan Ground Self-Defense Force.

Overview
Many armies are looking into lighter, air-transportable vehicles that can perform many of the functions of tanks or medium artillery. Japan recently adopted the Type 16 maneuver combat vehicle which is similar to the US M1128 Mobile Gun System. Both are 8-wheeled lightly armored tank destroyers designed to be flown into a battle situation and keep up with fast moving infantry while providing direct fire support. Current thinking is that using the same or similar wheeled vehicle chassis carrying light artillery or heavy mortars would be useful for indirect artillery fire.

Development
Research on the future multi-functional wheeled combat vehicle (Light-weight Combat Vehicle, LCV) is ongoing. LCV has a remote turret with Line-of-Sight (LOS) and Non-Line-of-Sight (NLOS) firing capabilities, and a dual recoil gun system providing adequate internal layout for combat crews. The LCV also has a hybrid power system with in-wheel motors. By raising and lowering the chassis the LCV provides both resistance against the blast effect of IEDs (improvised explosive devices) and improves driving stability.

Dual Recoil Gun System
To satisfy such contrary requirements, namely that a light-weight vehicle carry and fire repeatedly a large caliber gun, LCV has introduced breakthrough technology; the so-called: Dual Recoil Gun System. In this system, the primary recoil brake reduces the firing reaction, followed by the secondary recoil brake which reduces the force even more. With this technology, the LCV can carry a large caliber gun on a light-weight vehicle.

See also
 AMOS
 Armored car (military)
 Cardom
 M1129 Mortar Carrier
 Patria NEMO
 M120 Rak

Notes

Armoured cars
Artillery of Japan
Post–Cold War military equipment of Japan